Osbeckia aspera, the rough osbeckia or rough small-leaved spider flower, is a plant species in the genus Osbeckia of the family Melastomataceae. It is native to India and Sri Lanka. Leaves are elliptic-lanceolate, base attenuate with more or less velvet-hairy on both sides. Flowers are pink in color, show terminal cymes inflorescence. Fruits are single seeded capsule.

Common name
Malayalam - kaattukadali (കാട്ടുകദളി)
Tamil - kattu-k-kadalai (காட்டுக்கடலை)

References

aspera
Flora of India (region)
Flora of Sri Lanka